Cemocarus is a genus of flies in the family Dolichopodidae. It is known from South Africa and Namibia.

Species
Cemocarus griseatus (Curran, 1926) (Synonyms: Aphrosylus griseatus Curran, 1926, Cymatopus capensis Parent, 1939)
Cemocarus stuckenbergi Grichanov, 1997

References

Dolichopodidae genera
Hydrophorinae
Diptera of Africa